Robert J Kirkpatrick is a researcher and writer on boys' fiction.

He was born in Stourbridge, on 2 November 1953 and attended grammar school in Lichfield, Staffordshire. He worked as a benefit officer for the Notting Hill Housing Trust from 1990, and wrote some best practice guides for Housing Associations.

Kirkpatrick has written extensively on boy's fiction and is the Secretary of the Children's Books History Society, the British branch of the Friends of the Osborne and Lillian H. Smith Collections of children's books at the Toronto Public Library. He has written several short monographs for the society.
 
One recent work, Henty Goes to School: School Life in the Novels of G.A. Henty
Kirkpatrick introduced the topic in the context of Henty's own schooling  and then interposed passages about school life from Henty's books with commentary. G. A. Henty never wrote a full book set in a school setting.

Kirkpatrick's most recent work has concentrate on illustrations and he has produced two books on illustrations. He has contributed a whole series of thorough and detailed biographies of illustrators of children's books on the Bear Alley blog.

Works

References

External links
 Osborne Collection of Early Children's Books
 Children's Book History Society
 Bear Alley Blog

1953 births
People from Stourbridge
British literary critics
British children's writers
British children's book illustrators
Children's literature criticism
Living people